Mogente or Moixent is a municipality in the comarca of Costera in the Valencian Community, Spain.

The municipal area contains the ruins of la Bastida de les Alcusses, one of the most important Iberian archaeological sites in the Valencian Community.

References

Municipalities in the Province of Valencia
Costera